Antanavičius is a  Lithuanian language family name. The surname may refer to:
Kazimieras Antanavičius (several persons)
Kazimieras Antanavičius (officer), partisan in the military of Lithuania, recipient of the Order of the Cross of Vytis
Kazimieras Antanavičius (economist) (1937–1998), signatory of the Act of the Re-Establishment of the State of Lithuania in 1990
Valentinas Antanavičius, Lithuanian painter

 

Lithuanian-language surnames
Patronymic surnames